Kuhestan Rural District is a rural district (dehestan) in the Central District of Nain County, Isfahan Province, Iran. At the 2006 census, its population was 1,735, in 551 families.  The rural district has 66 villages.

References 

Rural Districts of Isfahan Province
Nain County